Jürgen Hingsen (born 25 January 1958) is a former West German decathlete who won several medals at international championships and Olympic Games in the 1980s, and held the decathlon world record in 1982 and again from 1983 to 1984. His rivalry with British decathlete Daley Thompson proved one of the most exciting in athletics during the 1980s.

Biography
Also in 1984, Hingsen set his personal best in the decathlon at 8832 points – then a world record, and still the German record.

During the 1988 Summer Olympics in Seoul, South Korea, Hingsen made three false starts in the 100 metre sprint, and he was disqualified from that event – and effectively eliminated from that decathlon competition.

References

External links

 
 
 

1958 births
Living people
West German decathletes
Athletes (track and field) at the 1984 Summer Olympics
Athletes (track and field) at the 1988 Summer Olympics
Olympic athletes of West Germany
Olympic silver medalists for West Germany
Sportspeople from Duisburg
World Athletics Championships medalists
European Athletics Championships medalists
Medalists at the 1984 Summer Olympics
Universiade medalists in athletics (track and field)
Olympic silver medalists in athletics (track and field)
Universiade silver medalists for West Germany
Medalists at the 1979 Summer Universiade